Roberta Joan "Joni" Mitchell  (née Anderson; born November 7, 1943) is a Canadian-American musician, producer, and painter. As one of the most influential singer-songwriters to emerge from the 1960s folk music circuit, Mitchell became known for her starkly personal lyrics and unconventional compositions which grew to incorporate pop and jazz elements. She has received many accolades, including ten Grammy Awards and induction into the Rock and Roll Hall of Fame in 1997. Rolling Stone called her "one of the greatest songwriters ever", and AllMusic has stated, "When the dust settles, Joni Mitchell may stand as the most important and influential female recording artist of the late 20th century".

Mitchell began singing in small nightclubs in Saskatoon and throughout western Canada, before moving on to the nightclubs of Toronto. She moved to the United States and began touring in 1965. Some of her original songs ("Urge for Going", "Chelsea Morning", "Both Sides, Now", "The Circle Game") were recorded by other folk singers, allowing her to sign with Reprise Records and record her debut album, Song to a Seagull, in 1968. Settling in Southern California, Mitchell helped define an era and a generation with popular songs like "Big Yellow Taxi" and "Woodstock". Her 1971 album Blue is often cited as one of the best albums of all time; it was rated the 30th best album ever made in Rolling Stones 2003 list of the "500 Greatest Albums of All Time", rising to number 3 in the 2020 edition. In 2000, The New York Times chose Blue as one of the 25 albums that represented "turning points and pinnacles in 20th-century popular music". NPR ranked Blue number 1 on a 2017 list of Greatest Albums Made By Women.

Mitchell began exploring more jazz-influenced ideas on 1974's Court and Spark, which featured the radio hits "Help Me" and "Free Man in Paris" and became her best-selling album. Mitchell's vocal range began to shift from mezzo-soprano to that of a wide-ranging contralto around 1975. Her distinctive piano and open-tuned guitar compositions also grew more harmonically and rhythmically complex as she melded jazz with rock and roll, R&B, classical music and non-Western beats. Starting in the mid-1970s, she began working with noted jazz musicians including Jaco Pastorius, Tom Scott, Wayne Shorter, Herbie Hancock, and Pat Metheny as well as Charles Mingus, who asked her to collaborate on his final recordings. She later turned to pop and electronic music and engaged in political protest. She was awarded a Lifetime Achievement Award at the 44th Annual Grammy Awards in 2002.

Mitchell produced or co-produced most of her albums and designed most of her own album covers, describing herself as a "painter derailed by circumstance". A critic of the music industry, she quit touring and released her 17th and last album of original songs in 2007.  She would give occasional interviews and make appearances to speak on various causes over the next two decades, though the rupture of a brain aneurysm in 2015 led to a long period of recovery and therapy.  A series of retrospective compilations were released over the time period, culminating in the Joni Mitchell Archives, a project to publish much of Joni's unreleased material from her long career.  She returned to public appearances in 2021, accepting several awards in person, including a Kennedy Center Honor in 2021.  She performed live for the first time in 9 years, with an unannounced appearance at the June 2022 Newport Folk Festival, and is scheduled to perform a headline show on June 10, 2023.

Life and career

1943–1963: Early life and education
Mitchell was born Roberta Joan Anderson on November 7, 1943, in Fort Macleod, Alberta, the daughter of Myrtle Marguerite (née McKee) and William Andrew Anderson. Her mother's ancestors were Scottish and Irish; her father was from a Norwegian family that possibly had some Sámi ancestry. Her mother was a teacher, while her father was a Royal Canadian Air Force flight lieutenant who instructed new pilots at RCAF Station Fort Macleod. She later moved with her parents to various bases in western Canada. After World War II ended, her father worked as a grocer and her family moved to Saskatchewan, living in Maidstone and North Battleford. She later sang about her small-town upbringing in several of her songs, including "Song for Sharon".

Mitchell contracted polio at age nine and was hospitalized for weeks. She also started smoking that year, but denies that smoking has affected her voice.

She moved with her family to Saskatoon, which she considers her hometown, at age 11. Mitchell struggled at school; her main interest was painting. During this time she briefly studied classical piano. She focused on her creative talent and considered a singing or dancing career for the first time. One unconventional teacher, Arthur Kratzmann, made an impact on her, stimulating her to write poetry; her first album includes a dedication to him. She dropped out of school in grade 12 (resuming her studies later) and hung out downtown with a rowdy set until she decided that she was getting too close to the criminal world.

Country music began to eclipse rock around this time. Mitchell wanted to play the guitar, but as her mother disapproved of country music's hillbilly associations, she initially settled for the ukulele. Eventually she taught herself guitar from a Pete Seeger songbook. Polio had weakened her left hand, so she devised alternative tunings to compensate; she later used these tunings to create nonstandard approaches to harmony and structure in her songwriting.

Mitchell started singing with her friends at bonfires around Waskesiu Lake, northwest of Prince Albert, Saskatchewan. She widened her repertoire to include her favourite performers, such as Édith Piaf and Miles Davis, at age 18. Her first paid performance was on October 31, 1962, at a Saskatoon club that featured folk and jazz performers. Although she never performed jazz herself in those days, Mitchell and her friends sought out gigs by jazz musicians. Mitchell said, "My jazz background began with one of the early Lambert, Hendricks and Ross albums." That album, The Hottest New Group in Jazz, was hard to find in Canada, she says, "so I saved up and bought it at a bootleg price. I considered that album to be my Beatles. I learned every song off of it, and I don't think there is another album anywhere—including my own—on which I know every note and word of every song."

After graduating from high school at Aden Bowman Collegiate in Saskatoon, Mitchell took art classes at the Saskatoon Technical Collegiate with abstract expressionist painter Henry Bonli and left home to attend the Alberta College of Art in Calgary for the 1963–64 school year. She felt disillusioned about the high priority given to technical skill over free-class creativity there, and felt out of step with the trend toward pure abstraction and the tendency to move into commercial art. She dropped out of school after a year at age 20, a decision that greatly displeased her parents, who remembered the Great Depression and valued education highly.

1964–1967: Career beginnings, motherhood, and first marriage
She continued to play gigs as a folk musician on weekends at her college and at a local hotel. Around this time she took a $15-a-week job in a Calgary coffeehouse called The Depression Coffee House, "singing long tragic songs in a minor key". She sang at hootenannies and made appearances on local TV and radio shows in Calgary. In 1964, at the age of 20, she told her mother that she intended to be a folk singer in Toronto. She left western Canada for the first time in her life, heading east for Ontario. Mitchell wrote her first song, "Day After Day", on the three-day train ride. She stopped at the Mariposa Folk Festival to see Buffy Sainte-Marie, a Saskatchewan-born Cree folk singer who had inspired her. A year later, Mitchell played Mariposa, her first gig for a major audience, and years later Sainte-Marie herself covered Mitchell's work.

Lacking the $200 needed for musicians' union fees, Mitchell performed at a few gigs at the Half Beat and the Village Corner in Toronto's Yorkville neighbourhood, but she mostly played non-union gigs "in church basements and YMCA meeting halls". Rejected from major folk clubs, she resorted to busking, while she "worked in the women's wear section of a downtown department store to pay the rent." She lived in a rooming house, directly across the hall from poet Duke Redbird. Mitchell also began to realize each city's folk scene tended to accord veteran performers the exclusive right to play their signature songs—despite not having written the songs—which Mitchell found insular, contrary to the egalitarian ideal of folk music. She found her best traditional material was already other singers' property. She said she was told "'You can't sing that. That's my song.' And I named another one. 'You can't sing that. That's my song.' This is my introduction to territorial songs. I ran into it again in Toronto." She resolved to write her own songs.

Mitchell discovered that she was pregnant by her Calgary ex-boyfriend Brad MacMath in late 1964. She later wrote, "[He] left me three months pregnant in an attic room with no money and winter coming on and only a fireplace for heat. The spindles of the banister were gap-toothed—fuel for last winter's occupants."  She gave birth to a baby girl in February 1965. Unable to provide for her daughter, Kelly Dale Anderson, she placed her for adoption. The experience remained private for most of Mitchell's career, although she alluded to it in several songs, such as "Little Green", which she performed in the 1960s and recorded eventually for the 1971 album Blue. In "Chinese Cafe", from the 1982 album Wild Things Run Fast, Mitchell sang, "Your kids are coming up straight / My child's a stranger / I bore her / But I could not raise her." These lyrics did not receive wide attention at the time.

The existence of Mitchell's daughter was not publicly known until 1993, when a roommate from Mitchell's art school days in the 1960s sold the story of the adoption to a tabloid magazine. By that time, Mitchell's daughter, renamed Kilauren Gibb, had already begun a search for her biological parents. Mitchell and her daughter met in 1997. After the reunion, Mitchell said that she lost interest in songwriting, and she later identified her daughter's birth and her inability to take care of her as the moment when her songwriting inspiration had really begun. When she could not express herself to the person she wanted to talk to, she became attuned to the whole world, and she began to write personally.

A few weeks after the birth of her daughter in February 1965, Mitchell was playing gigs again around Yorkville, often with a friend, Vicky Taylor, and was beginning to sing original material for the first time, written with her unique open tunings. In March and April she found work at the Penny Farthing, a folk club in Toronto. There she met New York City-born American folk singer Charles Scott "Chuck" Mitchell, from Michigan. Chuck was immediately attracted to her and impressed by her performance, and he told her that he could get her steady work in the coffeehouses he knew in the United States.

Mitchell left Canada for the first time in late April 1965. She travelled with Chuck Mitchell to the US, where they began playing music together. Joni, 21 years old, married Chuck in an official ceremony in his hometown in June 1965 and took his surname. She said, "I made my dress and bridesmaids' dresses. We had no money... I walked down the aisle brandishing my daisies." Mitchell is both a Canadian and U.S. citizen.

While living at the Verona apartments in Detroit's Cass Corridor, the couple regularly performed at area coffee houses, including the Chess Mate on Livernois, near Six Mile Road; the Alcove bar, near Wayne State University; the Rathskeller, a restaurant on the campus of the University of Detroit; and the Raven Gallery in Southfield. She began playing and composing songs in alternative guitar tunings taught to her by a fellow musician, Eric Andersen, in Detroit. Oscar Brand featured her several times on his CBC television program Let's Sing Out in 1965 and 1966. The marriage and partnership of Joni and Chuck Mitchell ended with their divorce in early 1967, and she moved to New York City to follow her musical path as a solo artist. She played venues up and down the East Coast, including Philadelphia, Boston, and Fort Bragg, North Carolina. She performed frequently in coffeehouses and folk clubs and, by this time creating her own material, became well known for her unique songwriting and her innovative guitar style.

1968–1969: Breakthrough with Song to a Seagull and Clouds
Folk singer Tom Rush had met Mitchell in Toronto and was impressed with her songwriting ability. He took "Urge for Going" to the popular folk artist Judy Collins, but she was not interested in the song at the time, so Rush recorded it himself. Country singer George Hamilton IV heard Rush performing it and recorded a hit country version. Other artists who recorded Mitchell's songs in the early years were Buffy Sainte-Marie ("The Circle Game"), Dave Van Ronk ("Both Sides Now"), and eventually Judy Collins ("Both Sides Now", a top ten hit for her, and "Michael from Mountains", both included on her 1967 album Wildflowers). Collins also covered "Chelsea Morning", another recording that eclipsed Mitchell's own commercial success early on.

While Mitchell was playing one night in 1967 in the Gaslight South, a club in Coconut Grove, Florida, David Crosby walked in and was immediately struck by her ability and her appeal as an artist. She accompanied him back to Los Angeles, where he set about introducing her and her music to his friends. Soon she was being managed by Elliot Roberts, who, after being urged by Buffy Sainte-Marie, had first seen her play in a Greenwich Village coffee house. He had a close business association with David Geffen. Roberts and Geffen were to have important influences on her career. Eventually she was signed to the Warners-affiliated Reprise label by talent scout Andy Wickham. Crosby convinced Reprise to let Mitchell record a solo acoustic album without the folk-rock overdubs in vogue at that time, and his clout earned him a producer's credit in March 1968, when Reprise released her debut album, known either as Joni Mitchell or Song to a Seagull.

Mitchell toured steadily to promote the LP. The tour helped create eager anticipation for Mitchell's second LP, Clouds, which was released in April 1969. This album contained Mitchell's own versions of some of her songs already recorded and performed by other artists: "Chelsea Morning", "Both Sides, Now", and "Tin Angel". The covers of both LPs, including a self-portrait on Clouds, were designed and painted by Mitchell, a blending of her painting and music that she continued throughout her career.

1970–1972: Ladies of the Canyon and Blue

In March 1970, Clouds produced her first Grammy Award for Best Folk Performance. The following month, Reprise released her third album, Ladies of the Canyon. Mitchell's sound was already beginning to expand beyond the confines of acoustic folk music and toward pop and rock, with more overdubs, percussion, and backing vocals, and for the first time, many songs composed on piano, which became a hallmark of Mitchell's style in her most popular era. Her own version of "Woodstock", slower than the cover by Crosby, Stills, Nash & Young, was performed solo on a Wurlitzer electric piano. The album also included the already-familiar song "The Circle Game" and the environmental anthem "Big Yellow Taxi", with its now-famous line, "they paved paradise and put up a parking lot."

Ladies of the Canyon was an instant smash on FM radio and sold briskly, eventually becoming Mitchell's first gold album (selling over a half million copies). She made a decision to stop touring for a year and just write and paint, yet she was still voted "Top Female Performer" for 1970 by Melody Maker, a leading UK pop music magazine. On the April 1971 release of James Taylor's Mud Slide Slim and the Blue Horizon album, Mitchell is credited with backup vocals on the track "You've Got a Friend". The songs she wrote during the months she took off for travel and life experience appeared on her next album, Blue, released in June 1971. Comparing Joni Mitchell's talent to his own, David Crosby said, "By the time she did Blue, she was past me and rushing toward the horizon".

Blue was an almost instant critical and commercial success, peaking in the top 20 of the Billboard albums chart in September and also hitting the British Top 3. The lushly produced "Carey" was the single at the time, but musically, other parts of Blue departed further from the sounds of Ladies of the Canyon. Simpler, rhythmic acoustic parts allowed a focus on Mitchell's voice and emotions ("All I Want", "A Case of You"), while others such as "Blue", "River" and "The Last Time I Saw Richard" were sung to her rolling piano accompaniment. Her most confessional album, Mitchell later said of Blue, "I have, on occasion, sacrificed myself and my own emotional makeup, ... singing 'I'm selfish and I'm sad', for instance. We all suffer for our loneliness, but at the time of Blue, our pop stars never admitted these things." In its lyrics, the album was regarded as an inspired culmination of her early work, with depressed assessments of the world around her serving as counterpoint to exuberant expressions of romantic love (for example, in "California"). Mitchell later remarked, "At that period of my life, I had no personal defenses. I felt like a cellophane wrapper on a pack of cigarettes. I felt like I had absolutely no secrets from the world and I couldn't pretend in my life to be strong."

1972–1975: For the Roses and Court and Spark

Mitchell decided to return to the live stage after the great success of Blue, and she presented new songs on tour which appeared on her next album, her fifth, For the Roses. The album was released in October 1972 and immediately zoomed up the charts. She followed with the single, "You Turn Me On, I'm a Radio", which peaked at No. 25 in the Billboard charts in February 1973.

Court and Spark, released in January 1974, saw Mitchell begin the flirtation with jazz and jazz fusion that marked her experimental period ahead. Court and Spark went to No. 1 on the Cashbox Album Charts. The LP made Mitchell a widely popular act for perhaps the only time in her career, on the strength of popular tracks such as the rocker "Raised on Robbery", which was released right before Christmas 1973, and "Help Me", which was released in March of the following year, and became Mitchell's only Top 10 single when it peaked at No. 7 in the first week of June. "Free Man in Paris" was another hit single and staple in her catalog.

While recording Court and Spark, Mitchell had tried to make a clean break with her earlier folk sound, producing the album herself and employing jazz/pop fusion band the L.A. Express as what she called her first real backing group. In February 1974, her tour with the L.A. Express began, and they received rave notices as they traveled across the United States and Canada during the next two months. A series of shows at L.A.'s Universal Amphitheater from August 14–17 were recorded for a live album. In November, Mitchell released that album, Miles of Aisles, a two-record set including all but two songs from the L.A. concerts (one selection each from the Berkeley Community Theatre, on March 2, and the L.A. Music Center, on March 4, were also included in the set). The live album slowly moved up to No. 2, matching Court and Sparks chart peak on Billboard. "Big Yellow Taxi", the live version, was also released as a single and did reasonably well (she released another version of the song in 2007).

In January 1975, Court and Spark received four nominations for Grammy Awards, including Grammy Award for Album of the Year, for which Mitchell was the only woman nominated. She won only the Grammy Award for Best Arrangement, Instrumental and Vocals.

1975–1977: The Hissing of Summer Lawns and Hejira

Mitchell went into the studio in early 1975 to record acoustic demos of some songs that she had written since the Court and Spark tour. A few months later she recorded versions of the tunes with her band. Her musical interests were now diverging from both the folk and the pop scene of the era, toward less structured, more jazz-inspired pieces, with a wider range of instruments. The new song cycle was released in November 1975 as The Hissing of Summer Lawns. On "The Jungle Line", she made an early effort at sampling a recording of African musicians, something that became more commonplace among Western rock acts in the 1980s. "In France They Kiss on Main Street" continued the lush pop sounds of Court and Spark, and efforts such as the title song and "Edith and the Kingpin" chronicled the underbelly of suburban lives in Southern California.

During 1975, Mitchell also participated in several concerts in the Rolling Thunder Revue tours featuring Bob Dylan and Joan Baez, and in 1976 she performed as part of The Last Waltz by the Band. In January 1976, Mitchell received a nomination for the Grammy Award for Best Female Pop Vocal Performance for the album The Hissing of Summer Lawns, though the 1976 Grammy for that category went to Linda Ronstadt.

In early 1976, Mitchell traveled with friends who were driving cross country to Maine. Afterwards, she drove back to California alone and composed several songs during her journey which featured on her next album, 1976's Hejira. She stated that "This album was written mostly while I was traveling in the car. That's why there were no piano songs ..." Hejira was arguably Mitchell's most experimental album so far, owing to her ongoing collaborations with jazz virtuoso bass guitarist Jaco Pastorius on several songs, namely the first single, "Coyote", the atmospheric "Hejira", the disorienting, guitar-heavy "Black Crow", and the album's last song "Refuge of the Roads". The album climbed to No. 13 on the Billboard Charts, reaching gold status three weeks after release, and received airplay from album-oriented FM rock stations. Yet "Coyote", backed with "Blue Motel Room", failed to chart on the Hot 100. Hejira "did not sell as briskly as Mitchell's earlier, more 'radio-friendly' albums, [but] its stature in her catalogue has grown over the years". Mitchell herself believes the album to be unique. In 2006 she said, "I suppose a lot of people could have written a lot of my other songs, but I feel the songs on Hejira could only have come from me."

1977–1980: Don Juan's Reckless Daughter and Mingus
In mid-1977, Mitchell began work on new recordings that became her first double studio album. Close to completing her contract with Asylum Records, Mitchell felt that this album could be looser in feel than any album she had done in the past. She invited Pastorius back, and he brought with him fellow members of jazz fusion pioneers Weather Report, including drummer Don Alias and saxophonist Wayne Shorter. Layered, atmospheric compositions such as "Overture/Cotton Avenue" featured more improvisatory collaboration, while "Paprika Plains" was a 16-minute epic that stretched the boundaries of pop, owing more to Mitchell's memories of childhood in Canada and her study of classical music. "Dreamland" and "The Tenth World", featuring Chaka Khan on backing vocals, were percussion-dominated tracks. Other songs continued the jazz-rock-folk collisions of Hejira. Mitchell also revived "Jericho", written years earlier (a version is found on her 1974 live album) but never recorded in a studio setting.

Don Juan's Reckless Daughter was released in December 1977. The album received mixed reviews but still sold relatively well, peaking at No. 25 in the US and going gold within three months. The cover of the album would later create occasional controversy: Mitchell was featured on the cover in blackface disguise, wearing a curly afro wig, a white suit and vest, and dark sunglasses. The character, whom she called Art Nouveau, was based on a pimp who, she says, once complimented her while walking down an LA street. This character who symbolized her turn toward jazz and streetwise lyrics reappears in the concert video 'Shadows and Light', her contribution to the film anthology 'Love', and the music video for "Beat of Black Wings".

A few months after the release of Don Juan's Reckless Daughter, Mitchell was contacted by the esteemed jazz composer, bandleader and bassist Charles Mingus, who had heard the orchestrated song "Paprika Plains", and wanted her to work with him. She began a collaboration with Mingus, who died before the project was completed in 1979. She finished the tracks, and the resulting album, Mingus, was released in June 1979, though it was poorly received in the press. Fans were confused over such a major change in Mitchell's overall sound, and though the album topped out at No. 17 on the Billboard albums chart—a higher placement than Don Juan's Reckless Daughter—Mingus still fell short of gold status, making it her first album since the 1960s to not sell at least half a million copies.

Mitchell's tour to promote Mingus began in August 1979 in Oklahoma City and concluded six weeks later with five shows at Los Angeles' Greek Theatre and one at the Santa Barbara County Bowl, where she recorded and filmed the concert. It was her first tour in several years, and with Pastorius, jazz guitarist Pat Metheny, and other members of her band, Mitchell also performed songs from her other jazz-inspired albums. When the tour ended she began a year of work, turning the tapes from the Santa Barbara County Bowl show into a two-album set and a concert film, both to be called Shadows and Light. Her final release on Asylum Records and her second live double album, it was released in September 1980, and made it up to No. 38 on the Billboard charts. A single from the LP, "Why Do Fools Fall in Love?", Mitchell's duet with The Persuasions (her opening act for the tour), bubbled under on Billboard, just missing the Hot 100.

1981–1987: Wild Things Run Fast, Dog Eat Dog, and second marriage
For a year and a half, Mitchell worked on the tracks for her next album.

While the album was being readied for release, her friend David Geffen, founder of Asylum Records, decided to start a new label, Geffen Records. Still distributed by Warner Bros. (who controlled Asylum Records), Geffen negated the remaining contractual obligations Mitchell had with Asylum and signed her to his new label. Wild Things Run Fast (1982) marked a return to pop songwriting, including "Chinese Cafe/Unchained Melody", which incorporated the chorus and parts of the melody of the famous The Righteous Brothers hit, and "(You're So Square) Baby I Don't Care", a remake of the Elvis chestnut, which charted higher than any Mitchell single since her 1970s sales peak when it climbed to No. 47 on the charts. The album peaked on the Billboard charts in its fifth week at No. 25. During this period she recorded with bassist and sound engineer Larry Klein, whom she married in 1982.

In early 1983, Mitchell began a world tour, visiting Japan, Australia, New Zealand, Ireland, the United Kingdom, Belgium, France, Germany, Italy and Scandinavia and then going back to the United States. A performance from the tour was videotaped and later released on home video (and later DVD) as Refuge of the Roads. As 1984 ended, Mitchell was writing new songs when she received a suggestion from Geffen that perhaps an outside producer with experience in the modern technical arenas that they wanted to explore might be a worthy addition. Mitchell hired the British synthpop musician Thomas Dolby to assist with synthesizers and production, but found working with him difficult: "I was reluctant when Thomas was suggested because he had been asked to produce the record [by Geffen], and would he consider coming in as just a programmer and a player? So on that level we did have some problems ... He may be able to do it faster. He may be able to do it better, but the fact is that it then wouldn't really be my music."

Dog Eat Dog, released in October 1985, was only a moderate seller, reaching No. 63 on Billboards Top Albums Chart, Mitchell's lowest chart position since her first album peaked at No. 189 almost eighteen years before. One of the songs on the album, "Tax Free", created controversy by lambasting "televangelists" and what she saw as a drift to the religious right in American politics. "The churches came after me", she wrote, "they attacked me, though the Episcopalian Church, which I've seen described as the only church in America which actually uses its head, wrote me a letter of congratulation."

1988–1993: Chalk Mark in a Rain Storm and Night Ride Home
Mitchell continued experimenting with synthesizers, drum machines and sequencers for the recordings of her next album, 1988's Chalk Mark in a Rain Storm. She also collaborated with artists including Willie Nelson, Billy Idol, Wendy & Lisa, Tom Petty, Don Henley, Peter Gabriel, and Benjamin Orr of the Cars. The album's first official single, "My Secret Place", was in fact a duet with Gabriel, and just missed the Billboard Hot 100 chart. The song "Lakota" was one of many songs on the album to take on larger political themes, in this case the Wounded Knee incident, the deadly battle between Native American activists and the FBI on Pine Ridge Indian Reservation in the previous decade. Musically, several songs fit into the trend of world music popularized by Gabriel during the era. Reviews were mostly favorable towards the album, and the cameos by well-known musicians brought it considerable attention. Chalk Mark ultimately improved on the chart performance of Dog Eat Dog, peaking at No. 45.

In 1990, Mitchell, who by then rarely performed live, participated in Roger Waters' The Wall Concert in Berlin. She performed the song "Goodbye Blue Sky" and was also one of the performers on the concert's final song "The Tide Is Turning" along with Waters, Cyndi Lauper, Bryan Adams, Van Morrison and Paul Carrack.

Throughout the first half of 1990, Mitchell recorded songs that appeared on her next album. She delivered the final mixes for the new album to Geffen just before Christmas, after trying nearly a hundred different sequences for the songs. The album Night Ride Home was released in March 1991. In the United States, it premiered on Billboards Top Albums chart at No. 68, moving up to No. 48 in its second week, and peaking at No. 41 in its sixth week. In the United Kingdom, the album premiered at No. 25 on the albums chart. Critically, it was better received than her 1980s work. This album was also Mitchell's first since Geffen Records was sold to MCA Inc., meaning that Night Ride Home was her first album not to be initially distributed by WEA (now Warner Music Group).

1994–1999: Turbulent Indigo, Taming the Tiger, and divorce

To wider audiences, the real return to form for Mitchell came with 1994's Grammy-winning Turbulent Indigo. The recording of the album coincided with the end of Mitchell's marriage to musician Larry Klein after 12 years; Klein was also co-producer of the album.

Indigo was seen as Mitchell's most accessible set of songs in years. Songs such as "Sex Kills", "Sunny Sunday", "Borderline" and "The Magdalene Laundries" mixed social commentary and guitar-focused melodies for "a startling comeback". The album won two Grammy awards, including Best Pop Album, and it coincided with a much-publicized resurgence in interest in Mitchell's work by a younger generation of singer-songwriters.

In 1996, Mitchell agreed to release a greatest Hits collection, despite initial concerns that such a release would damage sales of her catalog. Reprise also agreed to release a second album, called Misses, that would include some of the lesser-known songs from her career. Hits charted at No. 161 in the US, but made No. 6 in the UK. Mitchell also included on Hits, for the first time on an album, her first recording, a version of "Urge for Going" which preceded Song to a Seagull but was previously released only as a B-side.

Two years later, Mitchell released her final set of "original" new work before nearly a decade of other pursuits, 1998's Taming the Tiger. She promoted Tiger with a return to regular concert appearances, including a co-headlining tour with Bob Dylan and Van Morrison.

On the album, Mitchell had played a custom guitar equipped with a Roland hexaphonic pickup that connected to a Roland VG-8 modeling processor. The device allowed Mitchell to play any of her many alternate tunings without having to re-tune the guitar. The guitar's output, through the VG-8, was transposed to any of her tunings in real-time.

It was around this time that critics also began to notice a real change in Mitchell's voice, particularly on her older songs; the singer later confirmed the change, explaining that "I'd go to hit a note and there was nothing there". While her more limited range and huskier vocals have sometimes been attributed to her smoking (she was described by journalist Robin Eggar as "one of the world's last great smokers"), Mitchell believes that the changes in her voice that became noticeable in the 1990s were because of other problems, including vocal nodules, a compressed larynx, and the lingering effects of having had polio. In an interview in 2004, she denied that "my terrible habits" had anything to do with her more limited range, and pointed out that singers often lose the upper register when they pass fifty. In addition, she contended that her voice had acquired a more interesting and expressive alto range when she could no longer hit the high notes, let alone hold them as she had in her youth.

2000–2005: Both Sides Now, retirement tour and retrospectives
The singer's next two albums featured no new songs and, Mitchell has said, were recorded to "fulfill contractual obligations", but on both she attempted to make use of her new vocal range in interpreting familiar material. Both Sides Now (2000) was an album composed mostly of covers of jazz standards, performed with an orchestra, featuring orchestral arrangements by Vince Mendoza. The album also contained remakes of "A Case of You" and the title track "Both Sides, Now", two early hits transposed down to Mitchell's now dusky, soulful alto range. It received mostly strong reviews and motivated a short national tour, with Mitchell accompanied by a core band featuring her ex-husband Larry Klein on bass plus a local orchestra on each tour stop. Its success led to 2002's Travelogue, a collection of re-workings of her previous songs with lush orchestral accompaniments.

Mitchell stated at the time that Travelogue would be her final album. In a 2002 interview with Rolling Stone, she voiced discontent with the current state of the music industry, describing it as a "cesspool". Mitchell expressed her dislike of the record industry's dominance and her desire to control her own destiny, possibly by releasing her own music over the Internet.

During the next few years, the only albums Mitchell released were compilations of her earlier work. In 2003, her Geffen recordings were collected in a remastered four-disc box set, The Complete Geffen Recordings, including notes by Mitchell and three previously unreleased tracks. A series of themed compilations of songs from earlier albums were also released: The Beginning of Survival (2004), Dreamland (2004), and Songs of a Prairie Girl (2005), the last of which collected the threads of her Canadian upbringing and which she released after accepting an invitation to the Saskatchewan Centennial concert in Saskatoon. The concert, which featured a tribute to Mitchell, was also attended by Queen Elizabeth II. In the Prairie Girl liner notes, she wrote that the collection is "my contribution to Saskatchewan's Centennial celebrations".

In the early 1990s, Mitchell signed a deal with Random House to publish an autobiography. In 1998 she told The New York Times that her memoirs were "in the works", that they would be published in as many as four volumes, and that the first line would be "I was the only black man at the party." In 2005, Mitchell said that she was using a tape recorder to get her memories "down in the oral tradition".

2006–2010: Shine and other late recordings
In an interview with the Ottawa Citizen in October 2006, Mitchell "revealed that she was recording her first collection of new songs in nearly a decade", but gave few other details. Four months later, in an interview with The New York Times, Mitchell said that the forthcoming album, titled Shine, was inspired by the war in Iraq and "something her grandson had said while listening to family fighting: 'Bad dreams are good—in the great plan.'" Early media reports characterized the album as having "a minimal feel ... that harks back to [Mitchell's] early work" and a focus on political and environmental issues.

In February 2007, Mitchell returned to Calgary and served as an advisor for the Alberta Ballet Company premiere of "The Fiddle and the Drum", a dance choreographed by Jean Grand-Maître to both new and old songs. She worked with the French-Canadian TV director Mario Rouleau, well known for work in art and dance for television, such as Cirque du Soleil. She also filmed portions of the rehearsals for a documentary that she was working on. Of the flurry of recent activity she quipped, "I've never worked so hard in my life."

In mid-2007, Mitchell's official fan-run site confirmed speculation that she had signed a two-record deal with Starbucks' Hear Music label. Shine was released by the label on September 25, 2007, debuting at number 14 on the Billboard 200 album chart, her highest chart position in the United States since the release of Hejira in 1976, over thirty years previously, and at number 36 on the United Kingdom albums chart. On the same day, Herbie Hancock, a longtime associate and friend of Mitchell, released River: The Joni Letters, an album paying tribute to Mitchell's work. Among the album's contributors were Norah Jones, Tina Turner, Leonard Cohen, and Mitchell herself, who contributed a vocal to the re-recording of "The Tea Leaf Prophecy (Lay Down Your Arms)" (originally on her album Chalk Mark in a Rain Storm). On February 10, 2008, Hancock's recording won Album of the Year at the Grammy Awards. It was the first time in 43 years that a jazz artist had taken the top prize at the annual award ceremony. In accepting the award, Hancock paid tribute to Mitchell as well as to Miles Davis and John Coltrane. At the same ceremony Mitchell won a Grammy for Best Instrumental Pop Performance for the opening track, "One Week Last Summer", from her album Shine.

In 2009, Mitchell stated she had the skin condition Morgellons and that she would leave the music industry to work toward giving more credibility to people who suffer from Morgellons.

In a 2010 interview with the Los Angeles Times, Mitchell was quoted as saying that singer-songwriter Bob Dylan, with whom she had worked closely in the past, was a fake and a plagiarist. The controversial remark was widely reported by other media. Mitchell did not explain the contention further, but several media outlets speculated that it may have related to the allegations of plagiarism surrounding some lyrics on Dylan's 2006 album Modern Times. In a 2013 interview with Jian Ghomeshi, she was asked about the comments and responded by denying that she had made the statement while mentioning the allegations of plagiarism that arose over the lyrics to Dylan's 2001 album Love and Theft in the general context of the flow and ebb of the creative process of artists.

2010–2022: Health problems, recovery, and archival projects

Although Mitchell said that she would no longer tour or give concerts, she made occasional public appearances to speak on environmental issues. Mitchell divides her time between her longtime home in Los Angeles, and the  property in Sechelt, British Columbia, that she has owned since the early 1970s. "L.A. is my workplace", she said in 2006, "B.C. is my heartbeat". Since 2011, she said she focuses mainly on her visual art, which she does not sell and displays only on rare occasions.

In March 2015, Mitchell suffered a brain aneurysm rupture, which required her to undergo physical therapy and take part in daily rehabilitation. Mitchell made her first public appearance following the aneurysm when she attended a Chick Corea concert in Los Angeles in August 2016. She made a few other appearances, and in November 2018 David Crosby said that she was learning to walk again.

Since 2018, Mitchell has approved a number of archival projects. In September 2018, Eagle Rock Entertainment released the Murray Lerner-directed documentary Both Sides Now: Live at the Isle of Wight Festival 1970, which included restored video footage and previously unseen interviews with Mitchell, plus a separate program featuring the complete concert uninterrupted. On November 2, 2018, Mitchell released an 8-LP vinyl reissue of Love Has Many Faces: A Quartet, A Ballet, Waiting to Be Danced. A limited-edition blue vinyl edition of Blue followed in January 2019.

On November 7, 2018, Mitchell attended the Joni 75: A Birthday Celebration concert in Los Angeles. To celebrate her 75th birthday, artists Brandi Carlile, Emmylou Harris, James Taylor, Chaka Khan, Graham Nash, Seal, Kris Kristofferson, and others interpreted songs written by Mitchell. Fellow Canadian artist Diana Krall offered two performances. Selections from that night's performances were released on DVD, along with a separate CD release. A vinyl edition of the album was released for Record Store Day in April 2019. Mitchell later attended another tribute concert, Songs Are Like Tattoos, which featured Joni 75 participant Brandi Carlile performing Mitchell's Blue album in full.

Mitchell approved Joni: The Joni Mitchell Sessions, a book of photos taken and collected by Norman Seeff, released in November 2018. Mitchell also revisited her poetry with Morning Glory on the Vine, a collection of facsimile handwritten lyrics, poetry and artwork originally compiled in 1971 as a gift for friends and family. The expanded and reformatted wide-release edition of Morning Glory on the Vine was published on October 22, 2019, in a standard hardcover edition, as well as a limited signed edition.

In September 2020, it was announced that Mitchell and Rhino Records had created the Joni Mitchell Archives, a series of catalog releases containing material from the singer's personal vaults. The project's first release, a five-disc collection titled Joni Mitchell Archives – Vol. 1: The Early Years (1963–1967), followed on October 30, 2020. In April 2022 Mitchell received a Grammy Award for 'Best Historical Album' for this release. She showed up personally to collect the award. On the same day, Mitchell released Early Joni – 1963 and Live at Canterbury House – 1967 (both culled from the 5-CD box set) as standalone vinyl releases.

A special remastered collection of Mitchell's first four albums (Song to a Seagull, Clouds, Ladies of the Canyon and Blue) was released on July 2, 2021, as The Reprise Albums (1968–1971). The collection is the first to feature a new mix of Mitchell's 1968 debut album, overseen by Mitchell herself. Commenting on the original mix of Song to a Seagull, Mitchell called it "atrocious" and said it sounded like it "had been recorded under a bowl of Jello."

On January 28, 2022, Mitchell demanded that Spotify remove her songs from its streaming service in solidarity with her long-time friend and fellow polio survivor Neil Young, who removed his tracks from the streaming platform in protest against COVID-19 misinformation on the popular Spotify-hosted podcast The Joe Rogan Experience. She wrote on her website: "Irresponsible people are spreading lies that are costing people their lives. I stand in solidarity with Neil Young and the global scientific and medical communities on this issue." British National Health Service doctor and author Rachel Clarke tweeted: "Both Neil Young & Joni Mitchell… know painfully well how much harm, suffering & avoidable death anti-vaxxers can cause."

On April 1, 2022, Mitchell was honored as the 2022 MusiCares Person of the Year by the Recording Academy. Mitchell was present at the Awards show accepting the award personally.

2022–present: Return to live performance 

On July 24, 2022, Joni Mitchell appeared unannounced as a special guest at the Newport Folk Festival in Rhode Island, where she had first played in 1969, as part of a set billed as 'Brandi Carlile and Friends'. It was Mitchell's first public performance in nine years. Supported by a group of well-wisher musicians, she participated in a 13-song set of her own material and covers (including one as accompaniment only, playing electric guitar). Over the years Mitchell had been hosting monthly music sessions, known as 'Joni Jams', at her home in Laurel Canyon, organised with the help of singer-songwriter Carlile. Musicians who had turned up to play included Elton John, Paul McCartney, Bonnie Raitt, Harry Styles, Chaka Khan, Marcus Mumford and Herbie Hancock. The music sessions were assisting her recovery, and in 2022 she was invited to join Carlile and others in a low-key appearance at the Newport Festival for a live performance of a 'Joni Jam'. Mitchell was given an ecstatic reception, and she said afterwards, "I was delighted and honoured. It gave me the bug for it." Songs performed included "Carey", "Come in from the Cold", "A Case of You", "Big Yellow Taxi", "Both Sides Now" and "The Circle Game". After her appearance at Newport, Mitchell told Carlile, "I want to do another show. I want to play again."

On October 19, 2022, Carlile announced that Mitchell would play a headline concert, billed as 'Joni Jam 2', in a weekend event at Washington State's Gorge Amphitheatre, "one of the most beautiful venues in the world", on June 10, 2023. Mitchell's last official headline shows were on the Both Sides Now tour in 2000.

Legacy

Guitar style

While some of Mitchell's most popular songs were written on the piano, almost every song she composed on the guitar uses an open, or non-standard, tuning; she has written songs in some 50 tunings, playing what she has called "Joni's weird chords". The use of alternative tunings allows guitarists to produce accompaniment with more varied and wide-ranging textures. Her right-hand picking/strumming technique has evolved over the years from an initially intricate picking style, typified by the guitar songs on her first album, to a looser and more rhythmic style, sometimes incorporating percussive "slaps".

In 1995, Mitchell's friend Fred Walecki, proprietor of Westwood Music in Los Angeles, developed a solution to alleviate her continuing frustration with using multiple alternative tunings in live settings. Walecki designed a Stratocaster-style guitar to function with the Roland VG-8 virtual guitar, a system capable of configuring her numerous tunings electronically. While the guitar itself remained in standard tuning, the VG-8 encoded the pickup signals into digital signals which were then translated into the altered tunings. This allowed Mitchell to use one guitar on stage, while an off-stage tech entered the preprogrammed tuning for each song in her set.

Mitchell was highly innovative harmonically in her early work (1966–1972), incorporating modality, chromaticism, and pedal points. On her 1968 debut album Song to a Seagull, Mitchell used both quartal and quintal harmony in "The Dawntreader" and quintal harmony in "Song to a Seagull".

In 2003, Rolling Stone named her the 72nd-greatest guitarist of all time; she was the highest-ranked woman on the list.

Influence
Mitchell's approach to music struck a chord with many female listeners. In an era dominated by the stereotypical male rock star, she presented herself as "multidimensional and conflicted ... allow[ing] her to build such a powerful identification among her female fans". Mitchell asserted her desire for artistic control throughout her career, and still holds the publishing rights for her music. She has disclaimed the notion that she is a "feminist"; in a 2013 interview she rejected the label, stating, "I'm not a feminist. I don't want to get a posse against men. I'd rather go toe-to-toe; work it out." David Shumway notes that Mitchell "became the first woman in popular music to be recognized as an artist in the full sense of that term.... Whatever Mitchell's stated views of feminism, what she represents more than any other performer of her era is the new prominence of women's perspectives in cultural and political life."

Mitchell's work has had an influence on many other artists, including Taylor Swift, Björk, Prince, Ellie Goulding, Harry Styles, Corinne Bailey Rae, Gabrielle Aplin, Mikael Åkerfeldt from Opeth, Pink Floyd's David Gilmour, Marillion members Steve Hogarth and Steve Rothery, their former vocalist and lyricist Fish, Paul Carrack, Haim, Lorde, and Clairo. Madonna has also cited Mitchell as the first female artist that really spoke to her as a teenager; "I was really, really into Joni Mitchell. I knew every word to Court and Spark; I worshipped her when I was in high school. Blue is amazing. I would have to say of all the women I've heard, she had the most profound effect on me from a lyrical point of view."

Several artists have had success covering Mitchell's songs. Judy Collins's 1967 recording of "Both Sides, Now" reached No. 8 on Billboard charts and was a breakthrough in the career of both artists. (Mitchell's own recording did not see release until two years later, on her second album Clouds.) This is Mitchell's most-covered song by far, with over 1,200 versions recorded at latest count. Hole also covered "Both Sides, Now" in 1991 on their debut album, Pretty on the Inside, retitling it "Clouds", with the lyrics altered by frontwoman Courtney Love. Pop group Neighborhood in 1970 and Amy Grant in 1995 scored hits with covers of "Big Yellow Taxi", the third-most covered song in Mitchell's repertoire (with over 300 covers). More recent releases of this song included versions by Counting Crows in 2002 and Nena in 2007. Janet Jackson used a sample of the chorus of "Big Yellow Taxi" as the centerpiece of her 1997 hit single "Got 'Til It's Gone", which also features rapper Q-Tip saying "Joni Mitchell never lies". "River", from Mitchell's album Blue became the second-most covered song of Mitchell's in 2013 as many artists chose it for their holiday albums. Rap artists Kanye West and Mac Dre have also sampled Mitchell's vocals in their music. In addition, Annie Lennox has covered "Ladies of the Canyon" for the B-side of her 1995 hit "No More I Love You's". Mandy Moore covered "Help Me" in 2003. In 2004 singer George Michael covered her song "Edith and the Kingpin" for a radio show. "River" has been one of the most popular songs covered in recent years, with versions by Dianne Reeves (1999), James Taylor (recorded for television in 2000, and for CD release in 2004), Allison Crowe (2004), Rachael Yamagata (2004), Aimee Mann (2005), and Sarah McLachlan (2006). McLachlan also did a version of "Blue" in 1996, and Cat Power recorded a cover of "Blue" in 2008. Other Mitchell covers include the famous "Woodstock" by Crosby, Stills, Nash and Young, Eva Cassidy, and Matthews Southern Comfort; "This Flight Tonight" by Nazareth; and well-known versions of "A Case of You" by Tori Amos, Michelle Branch, Jane Monheit, Prince, Diana Krall, James Blake, and Ana Moura. A 40th anniversary version of "Woodstock" was released in 2009 by Nick Vernier Band featuring Ian Matthews (formerly of Matthews Southern Comfort). Fellow Canadian singer k.d. lang recorded two of Mitchell's songs ("A Case of You" and "Jericho") for her 2004 album Hymns of the 49th Parallel which is composed entirely of songs written by Canadian artists.

Prince's version of "A Case of U" appeared on A Tribute to Joni Mitchell, a 2007 compilation released by Nonesuch Records, which also featured Björk ("The Boho Dance"), Caetano Veloso ("Dreamland"), Emmylou Harris ("The Magdalene Laundries"), Sufjan Stevens ("Free Man in Paris") and Cassandra Wilson ("For the Roses"), among others.

Several other songs reference Joni Mitchell. The song "Our House" by Graham Nash refers to Nash's two-year relationship with Mitchell at the time that Crosby, Stills, Nash and Young recorded the Déjà Vu album. Led Zeppelin's "Going to California" was said to be written about Robert Plant and Jimmy Page's infatuation with Mitchell, a claim that seems to be borne out by the fact that, in live performances, Plant often says "Joni" after the line "To find a queen without a king, they say she plays guitar and cries and sings". Jimmy Page uses a double dropped D guitar tuning similar to the alternative tunings Mitchell uses. The Sonic Youth song "Hey Joni" is named for Mitchell. Alanis Morissette also mentions Mitchell in one of her songs, "Your House". British folk singer Frank Turner mentions Mitchell in his song "Sunshine State". The Prince song "The Ballad of Dorothy Parker" contains the lyric – Oh, my favorite song' she said – and it was Joni singing 'Help me I think I'm falling. "Lavender" by Marillion was partly influenced by "going through parks listening to Joni Mitchell", according to vocalist and lyricist Fish, and she was later mentioned in the lyrics of their song "Montreal" from Sounds That Can't Be Made. John Mayer makes reference to Mitchell and her Blue album in his song "Queen of California", from his 2012 album Born and Raised. The song contains the lyric "Joni wrote Blue in a house by the sea". Taylor Swift also details Mitchell's departure from the music industry in her song "The Lucky One" from her 2012 album Red.

In 2003, playwright Bryden MacDonald launched When All the Slaves Are Free, a musical revue based on Mitchell's music.

Mitchell's music and poems have deeply influenced the French painter Jacques Benoit's work. Between 1979 and 1989 Benoit produced sixty paintings, corresponding to a selection of fifty of Mitchell's songs.

Maynard James Keenan of the American progressive metal band Tool has cited Mitchell as an influence, claiming that her influence is what allows him to "soften [staccato, rhythmic, insane mathematical paths] and bring [them] back to the center, so you can listen to it without having an eye-ache." A Perfect Circle, another band featuring Keenan as lead vocalist, recorded a rendition of Mitchell's "The Fiddle and the Drum" on their 2004 album eMOTIVe, a collection of anti-war cover songs.

Rejection of Baby Boom counter-culture 
Mitchell has said that the parents of baby-boomers were unhappy, and "out of it came this liberated, spoiled, selfish generation into the costume ball of free love, free sex, free music, free, free, free, free we're so free. And Woodstock was the culmination of it." But "I was not a part of that," she explained in an interview. "I was not a part of the anti-war movement, either. I played in Fort Bragg. I went the Bob Hope route [i.e., touring to entertain military personnel] because I had uncles who died in the war, and I thought it was a shame to blame the boys who were drafted."

Awards and honours

Mitchell has received many honors from her home country of Canada. She was inducted into the Canadian Music Hall of Fame in 1981 and received the Governor General's Performing Arts Award for Lifetime Artistic Achievement, Canada's highest honour in the performing arts, in 1996. Mitchell received a star on Canada's Walk of Fame in 2000. In 2002 she was named a Companion of the Order of Canada, Canada's highest civilian honour, making her only the third popular Canadian singer-songwriter (Gordon Lightfoot and Leonard Cohen being the other two) to receive this honor.  She received an honorary doctorate in music from McGill University in 2004. In January 2007 she was inducted into the Canadian Songwriters Hall of Fame. The Saskatchewan Recording Industry Association bestowed upon Joni their Lifetime Achievement Award in 1993. In June 2007 Canada Post featured Mitchell on a postage stamp.

Mitchell has received ten Grammy Awards during her career (eight competitive, one honorary), the first in 1969 and the most recent in 2022. She received a Grammy Lifetime Achievement Award in 2002, with the citation describing her as "one of the most important female recording artists of the rock era" and "a powerful influence on all artists who embrace diversity, imagination and integrity".

In 1995, Mitchell received Billboard's Century Award. In 1996, she was awarded the Polar Music Prize. In 1997, Mitchell was inducted into the Rock and Roll Hall of Fame, but did not attend the ceremony.

In tribute to Mitchell, the TNT network presented an all-star celebration at the Hammerstein Ballroom in New York City on April 6, 2000. Mitchell's songs were sung by many performers, including James Taylor, Elton John, Wynonna Judd, Bryan Adams, Cyndi Lauper, Diana Krall, and Richard Thompson. Mitchell herself ended the evening with a rendition of "Both Sides, Now" with a 70-piece orchestra. The version was featured on the soundtrack to the movie Love Actually.

In 2008, Mitchell was ranked 42nd on Rolling Stones "100 Greatest Singers" list and in 2015 she was ranked ninth on their list of the 100 Greatest Songwriters of All Time.

On February 12, 2010, "Both Sides, Now" was performed at the 2010 Winter Olympics opening ceremony in Vancouver.

To celebrate Mitchell's 70th birthday, the 2013 Luminato Festival in Toronto held a set of tribute concerts entitled Joni: A Portrait in Song – A Birthday Happening Live at Massey Hall on June 18 and 19. Performers included Rufus Wainwright, Herbie Hancock, Esperanza Spalding, and rare performances by Mitchell herself.

Owing to health problems, she could not attend the San Francisco gala in May 2015 to receive the SFJAZZ Lifetime Achievement Award.

In 2018, Mitchell was honoured by the city of Saskatoon, when two plaques were erected to commemorate her musical beginnings in Saskatoon. One was installed by the Broadway Theatre beside the former Louis Riel Coffee House, where Mitchell played her first paid gig. A second plaque was installed at River Landing, near the Remai Modern art gallery and Persephone Theatre performing arts centre. As well, the walkway along Spadina Crescent between Second and Third Avenues was formally named the Joni Mitchell Promenade.

In 2020, Mitchell received the Les Paul Award, becoming the first woman to do so. She will be honored as MusiCares Person of the Year in 2022.

In 2021, Mitchell was nominated for the Grammy Award for Best Historical Album, for her Archives, Vol. 1: The Early Years (1963–1967) collection. She won the award on April 3, 2022.

On December 4, 2021, Mitchell received the Kennedy Center Honor for a lifetime of achievement in the performing arts at the Medallion Ceremony, held at the Library of Congress in Washington, D.C. The next day, Mitchell attended the show at the Kennedy Center.

On January 1, 2023, Rolling Stone magazine ranked Mitchell as number 50 on its list of "The 200 Greatest Singers of All Time".

On January 12, 2023, it was announced by the Library of Congress that Mitchell would be that year's recipient of the Gershwin Prize with a concert set to be delivered in March in Washington D.C. in honor of the award.

ASCAP Pop Awards

|-
| 2005
| "Big Yellow Taxi"
| Most Performed Song
|

Grammy Awards

*Although officially a Herbie Hancock release, Mitchell also received a Grammy for her vocal contribution to the album.

Juno Awards

|-
| 1980
| rowspan="7" | Herself
| rowspan="2" | Female Vocalist of the Year
| 
|-
| rowspan="2" | 1981
| 
|-
| Canadian Hall of Fame
| 
|-
| rowspan="2" | 1982
| Folk Artist of the Year
| 
|-
| rowspan="2" | Female Artist of the Year
| 
|-
| 1983
| 
|-
| rowspan="2" | 1995
| Songwriter of the Year
| 
|-
| Turbulent Indigo
| Best Roots & Traditional Album
| 
|-
| 2000
| Taming the Tiger
| Best Pop/Adult Album
| 
|-
| 2001
| Both Sides, Now
| Best Vocal Jazz Album
| 
|-
| 2008
| Herself
| Producer of the Year
|

Pollstar Concert Industry Awards

!Ref.
|-
| 1986
| Tour
| Comeback Tour of the Year
| 
|

Discography

Studio albums

 1968: Song to a Seagull
 1969: Clouds
 1970: Ladies of the Canyon
 1971: Blue
 1972: For the Roses
 1974: Court and Spark
 1975: The Hissing of Summer Lawns
 1976: Hejira
 1977: Don Juan's Reckless Daughter
 1979: Mingus
 1982: Wild Things Run Fast
 1985: Dog Eat Dog
 1988: Chalk Mark in a Rain Storm
 1991: Night Ride Home
 1994: Turbulent Indigo
 1998: Taming the Tiger
 2000: Both Sides Now
 2002: Travelogue
 2007: Shine

References

General sources

Further reading

External links

 
 
 The Emergence of Joni Mitchell – public radio special by Paul Ingles
 
 
 Joni Mitchell at Rock and Roll Hall of Fame
 Radio New Zealand: Reflections on 1983 concert in Auckland

 
1943 births
20th-century Canadian women singers
20th-century women guitarists
21st-century Canadian women singers
21st-century women guitarists
Appalachian dulcimer players
APRA Award winners
Asylum Records artists
Canadian expatriate musicians in the United States
Canadian folk guitarists
Canadian folk singer-songwriters
Canadian folk-pop singers
Canadian Music Hall of Fame inductees
Canadian people of Irish descent
Canadian people of Norwegian descent
Canadian people of Sámi descent
Canadian people of Scottish descent
Canadian women folk guitarists
Canadian women folk singers
Canadian women painters
Canadian women pop singers
Canadian women record producers
Canadian women rock singers
Canadian women singer-songwriters
Companions of the Order of Canada
Crossover (music)
Female critics of feminism
Geffen Records artists
Governor General's Performing Arts Award winners
Grammy Award winners
Grammy Lifetime Achievement Award winners
Jack Richardson Producer of the Year Award winners
Juno Award for Artist of the Year winners
Juno Award for Vocal Jazz Album of the Year winners
Living people
Musicians from Alberta
Musicians from Saskatoon
Nonesuch Records artists
People from Bel Air, Los Angeles
People from Laurel Canyon, Los Angeles
People from the Municipal District of Willow Creek No. 26
People with polio
Reprise Records artists
Kennedy Center honorees